John Learie Estrada (born September 27, 1955) is the former United States Ambassador to Trinidad and Tobago and a former United States Marine who served as the 15th Sergeant Major of the Marine Corps from 2003 to 2007. Estrada stepped down from that post on April 25, 2007, turning over the billet to the next sergeant major, Carlton Kent. Estrada then retired from the military in June 2007, after over 33 years of service. He has also worked as a senior manager for Lockheed Martin Training Solutions from 2008 onward.

Estrada was nominated to be the United States Ambassador to Trinidad and Tobago in July 2013, was approved for the position on February 12, 2016, and became the ambassador on March 17.

Early life and education
Estrada was born in Laventille, Trinidad and Tobago on September 27, 1955. He immigrated to the United States as a teenager and became a naturalized citizen in 1988.

Military career
Estrada enlisted in the United States Marine Corps on September 19, 1973, and attended recruit training at Marine Corps Recruit Depot Parris Island in South Carolina. After completing F-4 aircraft maintenance schools at Naval Air Station Memphis, and Marine Corps Air Station Cherry Point, North Carolina, Private First Class Estrada was assigned to VMFA-451 at Marine Corps Air Station Beaufort, South Carolina in March 1974.

In December 1974, Lance Corporal Estrada was transferred to VMFA-232, 1st Marine Aircraft Wing, Marine Corps Air Station Iwakuni, Japan. He was meritoriously promoted to corporal in March 1975. In February 1976, Sergeant Estrada served with VMFAT-101, Marine Corps Air Station Yuma, Arizona. In September 1977, he transferred to VMFA-314, Marine Corps Air Station El Toro, CA. Reassigned to VMFA-323 in December 1978, he deployed with the squadron in November 1979 for 7 months aboard the aircraft carrier USS Coral Sea to the Western Pacific and Persian Gulf. In June 1980, Staff Sergeant Estrada transferred to VMFA-321, Marine Aircraft Group 41, Detachment "A" at Andrews Air Force Base, Maryland.

In August 1982, Staff Sergeant Estrada was ordered to drill instructor duty at Marine Corps Recruit Depot San Diego, where he served with Kilo Company, 3rd Recruit Training Battalion. He was meritoriously promoted to gunnery sergeant in January 1984. In October, Estrada returned to Beaufort for duty with VMFA-251 as the non-commissioned officer in charge of the Airframes Division. In November 1985, he was reassigned to VMFA-451 and deployed to the Western Pacific from January to July 1986 under the Unit Deployment Program. From January to March 1987, Estrada attended aircraft maintenance schools at Naval Air Station Cecil Field and Naval Air Station Jacksonville, Florida, retraining as an FA-18 Hornet hydraulic/structural mechanic.

In October 1987, Estrada returned to drill instructor duty, this time at Parris Island. He served as series chief drill instructor with India Company, 3rd Recruit Training Battalion and subsequently as standing operating procedures instructor and drill master at Drill Instructor School until his promotion to first sergeant in October 1990.

From December 1990 to March 1995, Estrada served as first sergeant for Intelligence Company, 3rd Surveillance Reconnaissance and Intelligence Group, Camp Hansen, Okinawa, Japan; Marine Security Force Company, Norfolk, Virginia; Electronics Maintenance Company, 1st Maintenance Battalion, 1st Force Service Support Group, Camp Pendleton; and Alpha Company, 1st Light Armored Reconnaissance Battalion, 1st Marine Division, Camp Pendleton.

From March 1995 to May 1998, Estrada served as sergeant major for 2nd Battalion, 1st Marine Regiment, 1st Marine Division at Camp Pendleton; and deployed with the 11th Marine Expeditionary Unit (SOC) and 15th Marine Expeditionary Unit (SOC) to the Western Pacific and the Persian Gulf.

In May 1998, Estrada assumed the duties as sergeant major for Recruiting Station Sacramento, California in the 12th Marine Corps District, Western Recruiting Region. From April 2000 to October 2001, Estrada was assigned as sergeant major, Marine Recruit Training Regiment, MCRD Parris Island, South Carolina.

From December 2001 to May 2003, Estrada served as the sergeant major, 3rd Marine Aircraft Wing. During this assignment, he was forward deployed and participated in Operation Southern Watch and Operation Iraqi Freedom.

Estrada assumed his post as the 15th Sergeant Major of the Marine Corps on June 26, 2003,  succeeding Alford L. McMichael. On April 25, 2007, Estrada stepped down from his post as Sergeant Major of the Marine Corps, turning over the post to Carlton Kent. Estrada was awarded the Navy Distinguished Service Medal for his service and retired from the Marine Corps in June 2007.

Ambassador to Trinidad and Tobago
In July 2013, President Barack Obama nominated Estrada to be the next United States Ambassador to Trinidad and Tobago, the country of Estrada's birth. The United States Senate did not act upon the nomination. Obama renominated Estrada on January 6, 2014. Estrada was approved for the position on February 12, 2016 and became the ambassador on March 17, 2016.

After retirement

In November 2020, Estrada was named a volunteer member of the Joe Biden presidential transition Agency Review Team to support transition efforts related to the United States Department of Defense.

Personal life
Estrada formally endorsed U.S. Senator Barack Obama for President of the United States during a rally at Battery Creek High School in Beaufort, South Carolina on January 24, 2008. On August 28, 2008, Estrada spoke at the Democratic National Convention, echoing his support for Obama, citing his "obligation... to protect the Marines, sailors and their families."

In July 2010, U.S. President Barack Obama nominated Estrada to serve as a commissioner for the American Battle Monuments Commission, the agency overseeing U.S. Armed Forces cemeteries and memorials overseas. Estrada previously served as a committee member of the Defense Advisory Committee on Women in the Services, a member of the Board of Directors for Operation Homefront, and on the executive committee for the United Service Organizations.

Estrada is married to Elizabeth Cote Estrada, who is a doctor. They met in 2012 and were married in January 2014. Together they have twin daughters, Eva and Marie.

Awards and honors
Estrada's personal awards include:

Notes
 Estrada also rates expert in rifle and sharpshooter in pistol marksmanship badges, as well as eight service stripes.

References

Further reading
This article incorporates text in the public domain from U.S. Government agencies.

External links

 

|-

1955 births
Living people
African-American businesspeople
American businesspeople
African-American diplomats
African-American United States Navy personnel
Ambassadors of the United States to Trinidad and Tobago
United States Marine Corps personnel of the Iraq War
Obama administration personnel
People from Laventille
Recipients of the Navy Distinguished Service Medal
Sergeants Major of the Marine Corps
Trinidad and Tobago emigrants to the United States